Evanger is a village in the municipality of Voss in Vestland county, Norway. The village lies in western Voss at the eastern end of the lake Evangervatnet where the river Vosso empties into the lake.

History
Evanger was the administrative centre of the old municipality of Evanger, which existed from 1885 until 1964.  Evanger Church (Evanger kyrkje) is located in the village.

The European route E16 highway runs through the village, on its way from the city of Bergen to the village of Vossevangen.  The Bergensbanen railway line stops at Evanger Station as the railroad goes through the village from the west coast of Norway to the eastern coast.  Evanger has a sausage factory and some other small industries in the village.

The Evanger Hydroelectric Power Station is built in the mountains just northwest of the village of Evanger, in the mountains. The power plant started production in 1969 and was modified in 1977. The power plant receives water from the Eksingedalen and Teigdalen valleys. The power station is equipped with three Pelton turbines and is owned and operated by BKK.

Media gallery

References

Villages in Vestland
Voss